Asma bint Muqbi bin Awad Al-Ahmadi (Arabic: أسماء بنت مقبل بن عوض الأحمدي) is a Saudi academic writer and critic.

Academic qualifications and expertise 
Dr. Al-Ahmadi hold a Ph.D. degree in Philosophy- in Arabic Language and Literature, she is currently working as an Assistant Professor in the Department of Islamic Culture and Language Skills at the faculty of Science and Literature in King Abdulaziz University since 1434 AH. Previously, she was a general teacher of Arabic from 1428 AH to 1434 AH.

Works 
"Critical study: Problems of the secret self in the Saudi women's novels (1999–2012)" (Arabic title: I'shkaliyat Al-that Al-saridah fe Al-riwayat Al-nisa'eyah Al-saudiyah), published by Arab Scientific Publishers in 2020, and the book "The phenomenon of leaving in the Saudi short story- an artistic study" (Arabic title: Thahirat Al-raheal fe Al-Qisah Al-Qasirah fi Al-mamlakah Al-Arabia Al-Saudiyah- Dirasah Faniyah), published by Al-Jouf Literary Club and Arab Diffusion Company in 2013. A story collection called "Between them Isthmus" (Arabic title: Baynahoma barzik), published by Jazan Literary Club and Arab Scientific Publishers in 2017. She wrote some stories published in a joint book by selected Arab writers entitled (Arabic title: Shatharat Al-qawafi) published by Dar Qalam Al-Khayal for publishing and distribution in 2017, and has worked on a number of scientific, literary papers and studies published in local and Arab newspapers and journals.

Awards 
Asma Al-Ahmadi won the Sharjah Award for Gulf women’s creations in 2019. In 2021, she won the Sheikh Zayed book award for the young author's section for "Critical study: Problems of the secret self in the Saudi women's novels (1999–2012)" (Arabic title: I'shkaliyat Al-that Al-saridah fe Al-riwayat Al-nisa'eyah Al-saudiyah), published by Arab Scientific Publishers in 2020.

References 

Saudi Arabian writers
Women critics
Year of birth missing (living people)
Living people